Louis Morison (born 16 December 2001) is an English footballer who plays as a midfielder for Tiverton Town.

Career
A member of Exeter City's youth academy since the U9's, Morison signed a professional contract with the club on 15 June 2020. Morison made his professional with Exeter City in a 3–2 EFL Cup win over Forest Green Rovers on 8 September 2020.

In September 2020, he signed for Tiverton Town on loan, making a total of nine appearances before the season was curtailed by the COVID-19 pandemic in the United Kingdom.

On 12 May 2021 it was announced that he would leave Exeter at the end of the season, following the expiry of his contract. A month later, it was announced by Tiverton Town that he would be joining the club on a permanent basis.

References

External links

Exeter City FC Profile

2001 births
Living people
People from East Devon District
English footballers
Association football midfielders
Exeter City F.C. players
Tiverton Town F.C. players